Iván Ariel Rodríguez Traverso (born September 29, 1975) is a Puerto Rican politician who served as a Member of the House of Representatives of Puerto Rico. He represented the 16th Representative District, composed of the towns of Isabela, San Sebastian, and Las Marías. Traverzo is affiliated with the pro-statehood New Progressive Party of Puerto Rico (NPP).

Traverso first ran for office at the 2004 elections, but he lost to the opposing candidate. However, on the 2008 elections, he ran again and won.

He was expelled from the House of Representatives on December 10, 2010, after accusations of bribery, becoming only the fourth legislator to be expelled from the Puerto Rico Legislative assembly. During the trial against him, he was briefly represented by former PNP legislator, Nicolás Nogueras.

On January 27, 2012, an arrest warrant was issued against Rodríguez Traverso for 8 charges of corruption. He was arrested on January 31, 2012.

References

1975 births
New Progressive Party members of the House of Representatives of Puerto Rico
Living people
People from San Juan, Puerto Rico